The Liberal Party of South Africa was a South African political party from 1953 to 1968.

Founding 

The party was founded on 9 May 1953 at a meeting of the South African Liberal Association in Cape Town. Essentially it grew out of a belief that the United Party was unable to achieve any real liberal progress in South Africa. Its establishment occurred during the "Coloured Vote" Constitutional Crisis of the 1950s, and the division of the Torch Commando on the matter of mixed membership.

Founding members of the party included (original positions in the party given):
Margaret Ballinger (South African MP) – President of party
Alan Paton (novelist) – Vice-President
Leo Marquard – Vice President
Dr Oscar Wolheim – Chairman
Leslie Rubin (South African Senator) – Vice-Chairman
Peter Brown – National Chairman
H. Selby Msimang
Leo Kuper
Hilda Kuper

History

For the first half of its life the Liberal Party was comparatively conservative, and saw its task primarily in terms of changing the minds of the white electorate. It leaned towards a qualified franchise.

This changed in 1959–1960. The Progressive Party, formed in 1959, occupied the political ground that the Liberal Party had occupied up till then. In 1960 the Sharpeville massacre and consequent State of Emergency, during which several Liberal party members were detained, changed the outlook of the party. Another factor was the use of simultaneous translation equipment at party congresses, which enabled black rural members to speak uninhibitedly for the first time.

In the 1960s, therefore, the Liberal Party stood unequivocally for a democratic nonracial South Africa, with "one man, one vote" as its franchise policy.

The Liberal Party also supported liberal candidates in the Transkei bantustan elections, and helped its rural members and others, especially in Natal, to resist the ethnic cleansing brought about by the implementation of apartheid. This led to the banning of several party members and leaders.  One member of the Liberal Party, Eddie Daniels, spent fifteen years on Robben Island during Nelson Mandela's time there.

Contact
The newspaper Contact was closely tied to the Liberal Party, although officially it was a separate publication. The link is described by Callan as follows:

It may, however, be more accurate to tie the paper to Patrick Duncan than the Liberal Party.

End 

The party was in direct conflict with the South African government from the outset. This was due largely to the party's opposition to apartheid and criticism of the erosion of human rights by laws allowing detention without trial and arbitrary suppression of political opposition. Many of its members were placed under bans and persecuted by the South African government, which accused the party of furthering the aims of Communism.

In 1968 the South African government passed the so-called Prohibition of Improper Interference Act, which banned parties from having a multiracial membership. The Liberal Party was therefore forced to choose between disbanding or going underground, and in 1968 chose to disband. The final meeting was held in The Guildhall, Durban.

See also
Liberalism
Contributions to liberal theory
Liberalism worldwide
List of liberal parties
Liberal democracy
 Liberalism in South Africa

Notes

Bibliography

 
 
 

Anti-Apartheid organisations
South Africa 1953
Defunct political parties in South Africa
Liberal parties in South Africa
Political parties established in 1953
Organisations associated with apartheid
Political parties disestablished in 1968